The Sikorsky S-50 was a smaller lighter version of the Sikorsky R-6 designed for the United States Army Air Corps as an observation helicopter with dual controls in 1943. The design emphasized minimal weight and was to be powered by a  Franklin 6ACV-298 engine turning a three blade main rotor constructed of metal and plywood covered by 2 layers of fabric. The tail rotor also had three blades made from laminated wood. Further weight savings of the design included the rejection of a conventional oleo strut tail wheel in favor of a tail skid on a pivot cushioned by three rubber doughnuts.
One full scale wooden mock-up was built but no flying examples were ever produced.

Specifications

References

Sikorsky aircraft